The aquatic rat, Ecuador fish-eating rat, fish-eating rat or Ecuadoran ichthyomyine (Anotomys leander) is a South American species of semiaquatic rodent in the family Cricetidae. It is the only species in the genus Anotomys. This species is currently considered endangered. It is thought to be nocturnal and feeds on aquatic arthropods and insects. It is found in small ranges along the Andes.

Taxonomy 
Anotomys leander is the only member of its genus, which belongs the tribe Ichthyomyini, subfamily Sigmodontinae and family Cricetidae. The ichthyomyines are semiaquatic carnivorous rodents that are found in South America from Mexico to Peru.

Habitat 
A. leander has a very small range, the smallest range of the ichthyomyines. The species is found in northern Ecuador along the Andes mountains; however, it has also been found at a single locality in Colombia. Their habitat is primarily wetlands that have streams, but also includes grassy paramo and mossy elfin forest edge. Every known specimen has been found near running water.

Biology 
The aquatic rat possess several distinctive characteristics, many of which can also be found in closely related ichthyomyines. The length of the tail is greater than the length of the body, and they have very large hind feet. They also have reduced or absent pinnae covered by a tuft of white fur. These characteristics are believed to aid in aquatic hunting and movement. For hunting the rodents rely on their vibrissae (whiskers) to help locate prey along the streams edge. The vibrissae contain a very sensitive and developed trigeminal nerve that runs along the infraorbital foramen.

Diet 
The diet of this species is not completely known. It is believed to feed on small aquatic arthropods and larvae. A close relative from genus Chibchanomys, also an aquatic ichthyomyine, was found to feed on small fish, arthropods, as well as terrestrial and aquatic insects. This genus hunts along the edge of streams using their vibrissae and once prey is caught the rodent takes it to a safe place (sometimes a burrow) on land to eat.

Karyotype 
The karyotype has been reported to have diploid chromosome count of 2n = 92, but this number may have actually come from a specimen of the related Pittier's crab-eating rat, Ichthyomys pittieri. In any case, that value was previously thought to be the highest chromosome number known for a mammal, but it has since been found that the unrelated plains viscacha rat, Tympanoctomys barrerae, has 4x = 2n =  102.

Threats 
The species is listed as endangered and is threatened by pollution and habitat loss. Their small range makes them vulnerable to habitat loss. Because they rely on a partially aquatic habitat, water pollution, such as oil spills, also poses a serious threat.

References

Ichthyomyini
Endemic fauna of Ecuador
Mammals of Ecuador
Rodents of South America
Vulnerable animals
Vulnerable biota of South America
Mammals described in 1906
Taxa named by Oldfield Thomas
Taxonomy articles created by Polbot